Stephen Wildman (born 1951) is Professor of the History of Art at the University of Lancaster and Director of the Ruskin Library and Research Centre.

Wildman was educated at Bedford Modern School and Queens' College, Cambridge.  He was a Research Fellow and Director of Studies in History of Art at Queens' College, Cambridge (1976–79), Deputy Keeper of Fine Art at Birmingham Museum and Art Gallery (1980) and also its Curator of Prints and Drawings (1980–96).

He was Chairman of the Birmingham Branch of The Victorian Society between 1987 and 1990. He is also a Companion of the Guild of St George.

Wildman was an Honorary Research Fellow at the University of Birmingham (1991–94), a visiting fellow at Yale University (1994) and has been a committee member of the Walpole Society since 1999.

Selected works
David Cox, 1783-1859.  Published by Birmingham Museums and Art Gallery, 1983
Visions of love and life: Pre-Raphaelite art from the Birmingham collection, England.  Published by Art Services International, 1995
Edward Burne-Jones, Victorian Artist-Dreamer, by Stephen Wildman. Published by Metropolitan Museum of Art, 1998
Waking Dreams: The Art of the Pre-Raphaelites from the Delaware Art Museum, by Stephen Wildman. Published by Art Services International, Alexandria, Virginia, 2004

References

External links
Stephen Wildman at WorldCat Indentities
Stephen Wildman, Ruskin Library and Research Centre

Academics of Lancaster University
Alumni of Queens' College, Cambridge
People educated at Bedford Modern School
Living people
1951 births
Guild of St George